Ilargi, Ile or Ilazki is the name of the Moon in Basque language. In Basque mythology, she is the daughter of Mother Earth, to whom it returns daily.

Basque goddesses
Lunar goddesses
Basque mythology